Eilema humbloti is a moth of the subfamily Arctiinae. It was described by Hervé de Toulgoët in 1956. It is found on the Comoros in the Indian Ocean.

References

humbloti
Moths described in 1956